The following is a list of highways in Sonora.

Federal Highways
  Mexican Federal Highway 2
  Mexican Federal Highway 8
  Mexican Federal Highway 14
  Mexican Federal Highway 15
  Mexican Federal Highway 15D
  Mexican Federal Highway 16
  Mexican Federal Highway 17

State Highways
  Carretera Costera Riviera Mayo
  Sonora State Highway 37
  Sonora State Highway 40
  Sonora State Highway 56
  Sonora State Highway 100
  Sonora State Highway 147
  Sonora State Highway 149
  Sonora State Highway 155
  Sonora State Highway 162
  Sonora State Highway 163
  Sonora State Highway 176

Sonora